India: A Wounded Civilization (1977), by V. S. Naipaul, is the second book of his "India" trilogy, after An Area of Darkness, and before India: A Million Mutinies Now.   Naipaul came to write this book on his third visit to India. The book includes Naipaul's self evaluation and introspection of his views on India including poverty and suffering, while focussing more on history, religion and social structure in this book.

References

External links 

1977 non-fiction books
Travel books
Books by V. S. Naipaul
Books about India
Works about the Emergency (India)
André Deutsch books